Carowinds is a  amusement park located adjacent to Interstate 77 in Charlotte, North Carolina. The park straddles the North Carolina-South Carolina state line, with a portion of the park located in Fort Mill, South Carolina. However, it has an official Charlotte address, and its business offices are located on the Charlotte side of the park. The park opened on March 31, 1973, at a cost of $70 million. It is the result of a four-year planning period spearheaded by Charlotte businessman Earl Patterson Hall. Owned and operated by Cedar Fair, Carowinds also features a  water park, Carolina Harbor, which is included with park admission. The park has a Halloween event called SCarowinds and a winter event called WinterFest.

History

Early history
Carowinds was announced on October 10, 1969, and originally planned on being a large resort which would include a theme park, hotels, a shopping center, a golf course, and an NFL stadium. The name Carowinds was conceived from the park's original theme of the history and culture of the Carolinas, and is a portmanteau of Carolina and winds, in reference to the winds that blow across the two states. Ground was broken on May 1, 1970, with a planned opening date in April 1972. After numerous construction delays due to weather, the park eventually opened on March 31, 1973, under the ownership of the Carowinds Corporation, a consortium of local investors headed by Hall. The first season brought in over 1.2 million visitors, but attendance at Carowinds was curtailed by the 1973 oil crisis, and plans for the proposed resort were put on hold. Sagging attendance and mounting debt forced Carowinds Corporation to merge with Taft Broadcasting in early 1975.

Taft Broadcasting and KECO (1975–1992)

1970s
Taft originally ran the park through Family Leisure Centers, a joint venture between Taft and Top Value Enterprises. It was later transferred to a wholly-owned Taft subsidiary, Kings Entertainment Company. Taft Broadcasting brought new life to the park with its Hanna-Barbera characters and several rides aimed to appeal to younger guests. Carowinds added its second roller coaster, and first wooden coaster, with the addition of Scooby-Doo in 1975. The Wagon Wheel and The Waltzer flat rides were also added to the park. A small carousel was added to the Carolina Crossroads area. In 1976, Carowinds opened Thunder Road, a Philadelphia Toboggan Coasters racing wooden coaster designed by Curtis D. Summers. It was the largest and most expensive ride built in Carowinds' short three years of existence, at a cost of $1.6 million. The trains were relocated from the defunct Jetstream roller coaster at Chicago's Riverview Park. White Lightnin', a Schwarzkopf launched shuttle roller coaster, opened in 1977. The Witchdoctor was relocated to Pirate Island and renamed Black Widow. The Waltzer is removed after a year of operation and Wagon Wheel is moved into its place. Trams are added to the parking lot. In 1979, a $3 million expansion adds the County Fair area, which contains four new rides. Additionally, a 1923 antique carousel built by the Philadelphia Toboggan Company is added to The Land of Hanna-Barbera.

1980s
The Carolina Cyclone was added in 1980 as the first roller coaster in the world to feature four inversions. Thunder Road received new Philadelphia Toboggan Coasters trains. The original themed trains were destroyed after causing damage to the tracks. Rip Roarin' Rapids, a water rapids ride, opens in 1981. In 1982, Ocean Island opens as a separately ticketed attraction between Thunder Road and the White Lightnin' roller coasters. The water park was not owned by Carowinds, and included a 700,000-gallon, 25,500 square foot wave pool that featured waves reaching heights of five feet. The complex also featured other standard water park amenities including picnic and sunbathing areas, shower and changing facilities, a snack bar, game room, raft rentals and a gift shop. Oaken Bucket was removed. The Heritage Theater was converted into an arcade. In 1984, Smurf Island opens on a 1.3 acre island surrounded by the Carolina Sternwheeler river boat. The Flying Dutchman is removed and the Paladium is expanded. Blackbeard's Revenge, a motion simulator, is added in 1985.

In 1986, County Fair is renovated and Frenzoid, a 360-degree looping Viking ship, is added to the area. In 1987, Carowinds purchases Ocean Island. Vintage Jalopies is removed and the Panorama Vision theater is converted to an arcade. The following year, White Lightnin' is removed due to continuous maintenance downtime. The Balloon Race flat ride and WhiteWater Falls, a 45 foot tall water attraction is added. In 1989, Ocean Island is renamed to RipTide Reef and expanded to over 6 acres on the land previously occupied by White Lightnin'. Carowinds became the first amusement park in the United States to include a full water park with admission. Black Widow is removed the same year.

Early 1990s
In 1990, Gauntlet, a prototype thrill ride, was added to the park. The following year, the Paladium becomes a stand-alone concert facility- separate from the theme park with an expanded seating capacity of 13,000 after a $4 million renovation. In 1992, Kings Entertainment Company was acquired by Paramount Communications and Paramount Parks was formed, with the corporate headquarters a few miles away from the park in Charlotte. The same year, Carowinds introduces the Vortex stand-up roller coaster.

Paramount era (1993–2005)

1990s

The park's name was changed to Paramount's Carowinds in 1993. Movies and television shows from various Paramount Pictures were introduced into the park, including Days of Thunder. The Paramount Walk of Fame was constructed on the path from the park's main entrance to the park's central hub. In 1994, Wayne's World, a new three acre themed area that re-creates the Hollywood set popularized in the Paramount motion picture of the same name, is added to the northwestern corner of the park with the Hurler roller coaster as its centerpiece.

In 1995, Animation Station introduces an interactive experience for kids featuring The Power Station, a three-story climbing structure, and Kids' Studio, an outdoor amphitheater for children's shows. On June 30 of the same year, a skycoaster ride called Skycoaster opened in the Wayne's World section. Drop Zone: Stunt Tower was also added in 1996 in the same area. The park hosted 1.8 million visitors, making it one of the largest tourist attractions in the Carolinas. In 1997, to celebrate the park's 25th anniversary, RipTide Reef is expanded into WaterWorks, doubling its size to include 12 acres at a cost of $7.5 million. In 1998, ZOOM ZONE opens in Animation Station. The expansion adds three new attractions: Taxi Jam, Chopper Chase and Road Rally and increases the size of the area by 3.5 acres. The addition of Top Gun: The Jet Coaster in 1999 became the single-largest investment in the park's history at a cost of $10.5 million.

2000s
In 2000, The Nickelodeon Flying Super Saturator takes riders along a 1,087-foot suspended track while dodging a gauntlet of gushing geysers and rain curtains and was the first of its kind roller coaster in the world. SCarowinds, the park's annual Halloween event, is introduced for the first time in October. In 2001, the park introduced three new attractions including Scooby-Doo's Haunted Mansion, an interactive ghost-busting experience through the former Harmony Hall, Pipeline Peak, the world's tallest enclosed body slide and increases the size of WaterWorks to 13 acres, and the park's first 3-D attraction, 7th Portal. Plantation Square, the park's entrance area, is remodeled into Paramount Plaza. The Wayne's World theming is removed and the area is converted to Action Zone. The following year saw the addition of Carolina Boardwalk, a newly themed area that takes guests on a walk through of the famous beaches of the Carolinas. Included in this area is the parks 11th roller coaster, Ricochet. After the success of Flying Ace Aerial Chase at sister park Kings Island, Paramount decided to build a clone at Carowinds in 2003 as part of the Happy Land of Hanna Barbera's transition into Nickelodeon Central. In 2004, Nighthawk (then known as Stealth) was relocated from California's Great America and opened as BORG Assimilator in the location previously home to Smurf Island. Nickelodeon Central was expanded in 2005. On January 27, 2006, the Dayton Daily News reported that CBS, owner of Paramount Parks, was interested in selling all of its theme parks, including Carowinds. On June 30, 2006, Cedar Fair acquired all of the Paramount Parks, including Carowinds.

Cedar Fair era (2006–present)

Late 2000s

Although Cedar Fair continued to use the Paramount's Carowinds name through the remainder of the 2006 season, it began to phase out the Paramount name in press releases, the park website, and signage within the park. All references to Paramount-owned movies were removed immediately, with the exception of Nickelodeon Central, as Cedar Fair does not own the rights to use Paramount property. Several rides were renamed and rethemed, including BORG Assimilator (now known as Nighthawk), Drop Zone: Stunt Tower (now known as Drop Tower), and Top Gun: The Jet Coaster (now known as Afterburn). WaterWorks was expanded by four additional acres and the name was changed to Boomerang Bay in 2006. The addition of a heated lagoon and a children's water slide were among the changes made to the existing water park.

In January 2007, a new logo was unveiled featuring the trademark Cedar Fair flag on the letter I in the Carowinds name, removing Paramount altogether. The Carolina Skytower was repainted to feature the colors of the American flag. In 2008, a second, larger wave pool was added to Boomerang Bay due to increased popularity. Yo-Yo, a flat ride from Carowinds' former sister park Geauga Lake, was also added to the park. The Nickelodeon Flying Super Saturator is closed and removed. The following year, Carolina Cobra was also relocated from Geauga Lake in the spot formerly home to the Flying Super Saturator and includes new trains. Multiple pathways were repaved and the landscaping around the park was also improved. Nighthawk is repainted from black and green to yellow and blue. It is announced that the Powder Keg Log Flume located near the front of the park would be removed for future development.

2010s

In 2010, Intimidator, a 232-foot tall roller coaster, opened in the space formerly occupied by the Powder Keg Log Flume. A portion of the parking lot is re-configured to accommodate the ride's layout. Nickelodeon Central was also replaced by Planet Snoopy, introducing the Peanuts characters to the park. For 2011, the park saw general cosmetic improvements. Vortex received a new red and white color scheme, new picnic shelters were constructed in the Plaza Pavilion area, Thunder Road and Hurler had portions of their tracks reconstructed, and new seat walls, newly planted shade trees, and additional greenery was planted all around the park. In 2012, WindSeeker, a 301-foot tall swinging flat ride, opened in a filled portion of the main lagoon near Nighthawk. The park also continued to add more shade structures and replaced asphalt pathways with brick pavers throughout the park. On August 26, 2013, Cedar Fair announced a $50 million investment plan to expand Carowinds over three years starting in 2014. The expansion included a $30 million roller coaster, a $2.5 million water slide, a $7 million food complex, and $4 million to improve the park's ticket booths and front areas. The same year, the park introduced Dinosaurs Alive!, a 5-acre walkthrough attraction.

In 2015, Fury 325, the fifth-tallest roller coaster in the world, opened as another component of the park's previously announced "top-to-bottom" expansion program. A new front entrance replaced the original North Gate entrance of the park, the parking toll booths were replaced and expanded, and the parking lot was re-configured to accommodate the new entry plaza. Thunder Road is closed and demolished to make way for future development. In 2016, Boomerang Bay was re-themed and expanded into Carolina Harbor, removing the Australian theme. The expansion included a new six-slide complex, a new wave pool located on land formerly home to Thunder Road, and several new splash areas for kids. The original wave pool is demolished. For the 2017 season, the expansion of the County Fair area saw the addition of four new rides: Electro-Spin (a Mondial top scan), Zephyr (Zierer Wave Swinger), Rock N Roller (Mack Rides Music Express), and Do-Si-Do (HUSS Troika). Carolina Cobra was re-themed and renamed "The Flying Cobras", with a new blue and white color scheme. The park also announced that the Wings restaurant would be expanded. WinterFest, a Christmas event in November and December that previously operated in 2005, was also reintroduced.

In 2018, Planet Snoopy was expanded and converted into Camp Snoopy with the addition of six new children's attractions. The following year, Copperhead Strike, a double-launched roller coaster manufactured by Mack Rides, was opened in the all-new seven-acre Blue Ridge Junction area of the park and became the park's 14th roller coaster. Blue Ridge Junction was constructed in the area formerly occupied by WhiteWater Falls, Sand Dune Lagoon and Thunder Road's former station. A 130-room SpringHill Suites by Marriott, Carowinds' first on-site hotel, opened near the park's toll booths. Blue Ridge Country Kitchen opens in Blue Ridge Junction.

2020s
Carowinds did not open for normal operation during the 2020 season as a result of the COVID-19 pandemic in the United States. The park hosted a new holiday event, however, called "Taste of the Season" from November 21 – December 20, 2020. The event featured food, live shows, and other holiday activities throughout the park, as well as a select number of amusement rides. The park returned to normal operation in May 2021. In 2021, Boogie Board Racer, the longest mat racing slide in the Southeast, opened in Carolina Harbor. Retirement of the Rip Roarin' Rapids ride was also announced, along with the closure of the Dinosaurs Alive! attraction, to prepare for future development.

In May 2022, blueprints were leaked revealing an overhaul to the Crossroads area of the park, including the removal of the Action Theater and Yo-Yo attractions as well as the addition of four new flat rides. In July 2022, Carowinds confirmed the closures of Plants vs. Zombies 3Z Arena, Yo-Yo, and Southern Star attractions. Air Racers, Air Walker, Gear Spin, Gyro Force, as well as Hover and Dodge were announced as their replacements for the 2023 season. Beginning on January 1, 2023, Carowinds will be opened year round.

Themed areas and attractions

Aeronautica Landing 
Formerly Country Crossroads

Blue Ridge Junction

Camp Snoopy

Carolina Boardwalk

Carolina Harbor

Included in the price of admission to Carowinds is access to the 27-acre Carolina Harbor water park. Based on a Coastal Carolinian theme, it features 15 rides and attractions. It originally opened as Ocean Island in 1982, the water park has also been known as Riptide Reef (1989–1997) WaterWorks (1997–2006), and Boomerang Bay (2007–2015). On August 27, 2015, Carowinds announced an expansion for the area that added five additional attractions and resulted in the name changing to Carolina Harbor.

Carousel Park

Celebration Plaza

County Fair

Thrill Zone

WinterFest
Carowinds re-introduced WinterFest for the 2017 season. This seasonal holiday event features seasonal holiday decorations, tree lighting, Christmas carolers, homemade crafts, a themed parade, and select rides. The park previously had Winterfest in 1983 when owned by Taft Attractions and again in 2005 when owned by Paramount.

SCarowinds

In September 2000 the park introduced SCarowinds. It is an annual Halloween attraction and is presented on select nights in September and October, as well as the first weekend in November. The experience includes numerous haunted attractions and incorporates most of the existing park rides into a nightmarish experience.

Paladium 
The Paladium is an outdoor amphitheater located at Carowinds. It opened in 1975 and was the Charlotte area's premier outdoor concert venue until the opening of Blockbuster Pavilion, now PNC Music Pavilion, in 1991. It lost most of its major acts to the Uptown Amphitheatre at the NC Music Factory (now the Charlotte Metro Credit Union Amphitheatre at AvidxChange Music Factory) when it opened in 2009, and now hosts mostly Christian bands. Admission to the Paladium is separate from admission to Carowinds.

Styx performed there in 1975, NC's Charlie Daniels Band played there in '76, Jimmy Buffett performed there in '76, and B.B. King played there in '76. Johnny Cash played there in '78, The Beach Boys played in '78, and The Allman Brothers Band played there in '79. In 1980, the Paladium hosted Tom Petty and the Heartbreakers. Eddie Money played there in '84, INXS played there in '84, John Denver played there in '86, Robert Palmer in '88, and The Glenn Frey Band with Joe Walsh played there in '93. Tears for Fears played there in 1990, and C + C Music Factory performed there in '91.  In '91, Chapel Hill native James Taylor played there. Bon Jovi played to a sold-out crowd at the Paladium in 1993 during a stop on their I'll Sleep When I'm Dead Tour. Screaming Trees played there with Soul Asylum in '93. It had Virginia's Dave Matthews Band in '93, UK's Depeche Mode with Stabbing Westward in '94, Athens GA's B-52's in '94, Billy Ray Cyrus in '95, Blues Traveler in '96, Coolio in '96, UK's Duran Duran in 2000, Weird Al Yankovic in '00, Smash Mouth in '00, Sugar Ray in '00, and 311 in '04. Atlanta Christian rapper Lecrae performed there in 2014 (for Rock the Park), and Skillet played in 2015.

Fast Lane 

Fast Lane is a limited-access line queue system offered for an additional charge at Cedar Fair amusement parks. Visitors can purchase a wristband that allows them to bypass standard lines in favor of shorter ones at many of the parks' most popular attractions.

Carowinds Festival of Music
The annual Carowinds Festival of Music allows music students to perform in public, receiving comments and ratings from nationally recognized adjudicators. Bands, choirs, show choirs, and orchestras can all play for ratings. Plaques and ribbons are awarded for performances that receive ratings of superior and excellent.

Timeline

 1973: Carowinds opens on March 31; the Monorail is still under construction and opens later. Original theme areas:  Plantation Square, Contemporary Carolina, Frontier Outpost, Pirate Island, Indian Thicket, Country Crossroads and Queens Colony.
 1974: Country Kitchen is added; Whirling Well (Chance Rotor); picnic areas open. The Double-Decker Carousel is removed from the park at the end of the season and placed in storage.
 1976: Thunder Road;  narrow gauge Carowinds and Carolina Railroad removed.
 1977: White Lightnin' (Schwarzkopf shuttle loop coaster) in Pirate Island (entrance in Country Crossroads); Whirling Well renamed Oaken Bucket and moved to east midway.
 1979: County Fair area added.  Meteorite (enterprise); PT Bumpem's Auto Stunt & Thrill Show (bumper cars); Whirling Dervish (wave swinger); Wild Bull (Bayern Kurve); Carousel.

 1980: Carolina Cyclone was added in Frontier Outpost.
 1982: Rip Roarin' Rapids; Ocean Island (water park).
 1983: Cable Skyway removed.
 1984: Smurf Island (themed area).
 1985: Blackbeard's Revenge (mystery house).
 1986: Frenzoid, a looping Viking ship was added.
 1987: Expansion of Hanna-Barbera Land with three new rides; Old Jalopies antique car ride removed; Oaken Bucket removed.
 1988: WhiteWater Falls added; White Lightnin' coaster removed; Black Widow (thrill ride) removed.
 1989: Riptide Reef water park; Expansion of Palladium.

 1990: Gauntlet (shooting star, later renamed GR8 SK8).
 1991: Expansion of Palladium; Speedway Cars removed.
 1992: Vortex was added in the Carolina Showplace section of Carowinds.
 1993: Action Theater was added in the County Fair section of Carowinds. Paramount Communications buys Carowinds, King's Dominion, Kings Island, Great America, and Canada's Wonderland.
 1994: Wayne's World (later renamed Thrill Zone) section with Hurler and Carowinds Monorail removed.
 1995: Xtreme Skyflyer was added in the Wayne's World (later renamed Thrill Zone) section of Carowinds.
 1996: Drop Zone: Stunt Tower (later renamed Drop Tower: Scream Zone) was added in the Wayne's World (later renamed Thrill Zone) section of Carowinds.
 1997: WaterWorks water park is added.
 1998: Taxi Jam (Later renamed Lucy's Crabbie Cabbie), TV Road Trip (Later renamed Joe Cool's Driving School), and Chopper Chase (Later renamed Woodstock's Whirlybirds).
 1999: Top Gun: The Jet Coaster (Later renamed Afterburn) was added in the County Fair section of Carowinds.

 2000: SCarowinds; Flying Super Saturator (steel coaster) is added.
 2001: SCOOBY-DOO's Haunted Mansion (later renamed Boo Blasters at Boo Hill); WaterWorks expansion; Stan Lee's 7th Portal 3D (feature in Action Theater); Whirling Dervish (swing ride) removed.
 2002: Ricochet is added and the Carolina Crossroads area is re-themed to Carolina Boardwalk.
 2003: Nickelodeon Central, featuring Rugrats Runaway Reptar (New Vekoma SFC), Wild Thornberrys River Adventure (Formerly Powder Keg Flume), and Rocket Power Air Time (Formerly Gauntlet); SpongeBob SquarePants 3D (feature in Action Theater);  Carolina Sternwheeler (Original Ride) riverboat removed.
 2004: BORG Assimilator (later renamed Nighthawk) Flying coaster added.
 2005: Nickelodeon Central expands into Animation Station, featuring Phantom Flyers (relocated from Kings Island as Flying Eagles), Flying Dutchman's Revenge, Little Bill's Cruisers, Dora the Explorer Azul's Adventure (Formerly Yogi's Jellystone Tour) and Frenzoid removal begins in September.
 2006: Frenzoid was removed. WaterWorks was rethemed and renamed to Boomerang Bay and converting the old Frenzoid lake into a heated lagoon. Thunder Raceway Go-Carts was built in the Thrill Zone. The Funtastic World of Hanna-Barbera (feature in Action Theater) was also added. Paramount Parks is sold to the Cedar Fair Entertainment Company for 1.24 billion dollars.
 2007: Frenzoid was put back in as Southern Star in the County Fair section. The price for a single-day ticket dropped for the first time ever. Carolina Skytower was repainted to look like an American flag.
 2008: A second wave pool named Bondi Beach added along with cabanas in Boomerang Bay. This added  to the park making it . Geauga Lake's Yo Yo swing ride was also added in the title County Fair section. Flying Super Saturator only operates on the Boomerang Bay operating calendar. Thunder Road now runs both sides going forwards again. The Flying Super Saturator is removed from the park in August.
 2009: Carolina Cobra(later renamed The Flying Cobras), a Boomerang roller coaster featuring new trains from Vekoma, opens in the former location of the Nickelodeon Flying Super Saturator.  Carowinds rebuilds more sections of Thunder Road. Nighthawk was repainted with yellow track and navy blue supports. Hurler receives some re-tracking. Scarowinds returns for its tenth year. Wild Thornberry's River Adventure removed for a new attraction. Dora the Explorer Azul Adventure's track is also modified.

 2010: Intimidator: A ,  Bolliger & Mabillard hyper coaster replaces Wild Thornberry's River Adventure. Planet Snoopy replaces Nickelodeon Central, featuring Snoopy's Space Race, a small flying jet ride. Carolina Cyclone is repainted blue, yellow and orange. Scooby Doo's Haunted Mansion becomes Boo Blasters On Boo Hill, with new special effects; all connections to Hanna-Barbera's Scooby-Doo have been removed. Carowinds rebuilds more sections of Thunder Road. Carowinds starts replacing pavement with brick pavers to help reduce heat flow from walkways.
 2011: Snoopy's Starlight Spectacular, a million-dollar nighttime walk-through light and sound experience featuring the Peanuts characters. Snoopy's starlight spectacular utilizes light, sound, and motion to create a full sensory experience. Snoopy's Starlight Spectacular runs from May 28 to September 4 in the County Fair and the Planet Snoopy sections of the park. Vortex receives a new red track and grey support paint scheme. Ricochet receives a touch-up paint job. Work continues on Thunder Road and Hurler's rehab and work continues on replacing pavement with brick pavers to help reduce heat flow from walkways.
 2012: WindSeeker, a  thrill ride opens, Fast Lane added, Joe Cool's Driving School and Southside Pavilions close.
 2013: Dinosaurs Alive!, a walk-through Dinosaur Exhibit; Dinosaurs: Giants of Patagonia 3D (feature in Action Theater); $50 million expansion announced on August 26, to include multiple new attractions, concessions, games, and 285 jobs. This places Carowinds as the fourth largest Cedar Fair park.
 2014: Two new slides were added to Boomerang Bay: Surfer's Swell and Dorsal Fin Drop. New Harmony Hall marketplace is built in the Intimidator field, replacing Snoopy's GR8 SK8. Chick-fil-A moves into the former Country Kitchen building and a new restaurant, "Chickie's and Pete's" replaces Outer Hanks, and Auntie Anne's takes over Plaza Funnel Cake. The former Chick-fil-A is renovated into Funnel Cake Emporium.  Xtreme Skyflyer is renamed Ripcord and is relocated to Nighthawk Lake. Ricochet repainted. Go-Karts are removed and land clearing begins for a future roller coaster. Toll Plaza is removed and a new one is built further away from the park. The Plantation House entrance closes. 
 2015: Fury 325 debuts along with a new  main entrance plaza which was opened in association with the new coaster. Woodstock Express and Afterburn are repainted and Thunder Road, which operated for 39 years, closes permanently on July 26, 2015. Carowinds surpasses an annual attendance of 2,000,000, becoming the fifth most-visited Cedar Fair park. The mini Golf course is removed.
 2016: Boomerang Bay water park is expanded and renamed Carolina Harbor. Plants Vs. Zombies: Garden Warfare 3Z Arena, an interactive 3D game, debuts in Action Theater. Cirque Imagine becomes the new feature at the Carowinds Theater. Papa Luigi's Pizza is remodeled. Southern Sidewinder and Whitewater Falls are removed. 
 2017: Carolina RFD becomes County Fair with four new rides (Electro-Spin, Zephyr, Rock 'N' Roller, and Do-Si-Do); Old location of County Fair becomes Crossroads; Carolina Cobra is repainted and renamed to The Flying Cobras, and is rethemed to represent an airshow; Drop Tower repainted; Panda Express relocates to Joe's Cool Café, with old location demolished; New Game Card system is added for all games; WinterFest returns from November to December 2017. Woodstock's Whirlybirds, Woodstock Gliders, Snoopy's Space Race and Snoopy's Yacht Club are all removed.
 2018: Planet Snoopy becomes Camp Snoopy with the addition of six new attractions, and a complete re-theme of the area. Flying Ace Aerial Chase is repainted and renamed to Kiddy Hawk. The Carolina Showplace section of the park is renamed Carousel Park to fit in with the new carousel location. WinterFest becomes a permanent seasonal event. Carowinds' first hotel, SpringHill Suites by Marriott, is announced and begins construction for a 2019 opening. Land clearing of the former White Water Falls attraction begins for future expansion. Rip Roarin’ Rapids is "retired".
 2019: Copperhead Strike, a Mack double launched roller coaster, opens in the new Blue Ridge Junction area of the park. Woodstock Gliders is renamed Mountain Gliders and returns to the park. The Wings restaurant is converted and expanded into Blue Ridge Country Kitchen with new food offerings. Burrito Cafe is renamed Carowinds Cafe. Dinosaurs ALIVE! closes permanently on August 18.

 2020: A portion of Woodstock Express is retracked. The park does not open for its regular season due to the COVID-19 pandemic and later re-opens in November for the Taste of the Season holiday event. Intimidator is repainted.
2021: Boogie Board Racer, originally announced for 2020, debuts as the Southeast's longest mat racing slide. Grand Carnivale, also originally announced for 2020, debuts. New directional signage is added throughout the park. The park is faced with a worker shortage. Carolina Skytower is repainted. Surfer's Swell and Dorsal Fin Drop are removed.
2022: Plants vs. Zombies 3Z Arena, Southern Star and YoYo are removed. Carolina Cyclone and Nighthawk are repainted.

See also 
Incidents at Carowinds

References

External links

 

 
Amusement parks in North Carolina
Amusement parks in South Carolina
Cedar Fair amusement parks
Economy of Charlotte, North Carolina
Fort Mill, South Carolina
Buildings and structures in Charlotte, North Carolina
Buildings and structures in York County, South Carolina
Landmarks in North Carolina
Landmarks in South Carolina
1973 establishments in North Carolina
1973 establishments in South Carolina
Tourist attractions in Charlotte, North Carolina
Tourist attractions in York County, South Carolina
Amusement parks opened in 1973